The 1964–65 season was Cardiff City F.C.'s 38th season in the Football League. They competed in the 22-team Division Two, then the second tier of English football, finishing thirteenth.

The season also saw the club compete in European competition for the first time, reaching the semi-finals of the European Cup Winners Cup before being beaten by Spanish side Real Zaragoza.

Players

League standings

Results by round

Fixtures and results

Second Division

League Cup

FA Cup

European Cup Winners Cup

Welsh Cup

See also
List of Cardiff City F.C. seasons

References

Welsh Football Data Archive

Cardiff City F.C. seasons
Association football clubs 1964–65 season
Card